Scopula albilarvata is a moth of the family Geometridae. It was described Warren in 1899. It is found in Taiwan.

References

Moths described in 1899
albilarvata
Moths of Taiwan
Taxa named by William Warren (entomologist)